Global jihad can refer to:
Jihadism
Offensive jihad, the use of armed conflict to expand the Islamic world
Pan-Islamism, a political movement advocating a single Islamic state
Worldwide Caliphate, a worldwide Islamic government for the entire world, advocated by Islamic extremists